National Route 218 is a national highway of Japan connecting Chūō-ku, Kumamoto, and Nobeoka, Miyazaki, with a total length of 145.9 km (90.66 mi).

References

National highways in Japan
Roads in Kumamoto Prefecture
Roads in Miyazaki Prefecture